Estridge is a surname, and may refer to:

 Brian Estridge, sports broadcaster
 Chris Estridge (born 1989), American soccer player
 Edward Estridge (1843–1919), English cricketer
 George Estridge (1835–1862), English cricketer
 Larry Estridge (born 1902), St. Kitts middleweight boxer
 Philip Don Estridge (1937–1985), developer of the IBM Personal Computer
 Robin Estridge (1920–2002), British author of suspense fiction and screenwriter